Modern rock is an umbrella term used to describe rock music that is found on college rock radio stations. Some radio stations use this term to distinguish themselves from classic rock, which is based in 1960s–1980s rock music.

Radio format
Modern rock (also known as alternative radio) is a rock format commonly found on commercial radio; the format consists primarily of the alternative rock genre.  Generally beginning with Hardcore punk but referring especially to alternative rock music since the 1980s, the phrase "modern rock" is used in the US to differentiate the music from classic rock, which focuses on music recorded in the 1960s through to the early 1990s.

A few modern rock radio stations existed during the 1980s, such as KROQ-FM in Los Angeles, XETRA-FM in San Diego, WHTG-FM (now WKMK) on the Jersey Shore, WLIR on Long Island, WFNX in Boston, and KQAK The Quake in San Francisco. Modern rock was solidified as a radio format in 1988 with Billboards creation of the Modern Rock Tracks chart. The chart was based on weighted reports from college radio stations and commercial stations such as those listed above. The 1988 episode of the VH1 show I Love the '80s discussed INXS, The Cure, Morrissey, Depeche Mode, and Erasure as modern rock artists representative of that year. But it was the breakthrough success of the grunge bands Nirvana and Pearl Jam in 1991 that resulted in many American radio stations switching to the format. Modern rock is considered by some to be a specific genre of alternative rock.

The format has gone through two distinct periods, dividing the line from classic modern rock and the current alternative rock format used today. Up until grunge went mainstream, the format featured a wide variety of up-tempo danceable music from a diverse group of artists that were being played in rock discos and clubs. This was a legacy from new wave music and the Second British Invasion that immediately  preceded it. Of all the artists who had songs hit the top 30 in the first modern rock chart, only seven of them were American.  Between 1992 and 1994, most of the female, foreign and dance music had largely disappeared from the chart. While the chart still featured a variety of alternative rock music, it was largely guitar rock created by male Americans. By 1996, the modern rock chart was largely identical to the mainstream rock chart; it was therefore surveying what was then mainstream rock music.

2000–present
For most of the 2000s, modern rock radio stations mostly featured songs that were crossed over from the active rock format. This was often famous for the second wave of post-grunge and nu metal scenes that derived from grunge and alternative metal music, respectively, in the 1990s. During the early 2000s, these two genres made up most of the modern rock format, despite the format being a heavily diverse format genre-wise (for example, in 2003, it was not uncommon to hear diverse artists like Jack Johnson, Muse, Coheed and Cambria, The Postal Service, The Mars Volta, Junior Senior, Snow Patrol, Story of the Year, The Black Keys, and Kings of Leon all played on the same modern rock station). By the mid-2000s, the two genres were dropped, and the revivals of genres such as post-punk, garage rock, noise rock, and dance-punk (often tagged in as the post-punk revival of that time) took its place but the post-grunge and nu metal genres still had some success.

Today, modern rock serves as an indie-driven radio format featuring new, young and recent indie rock bands and artists.  Ranging from genres like reggae, folk, hip hop and EDM, common indie rock artists heard on the format today include Young the Giant, Of Monsters and Men, Atlas Genius, The Neighbourhood, Arcade Fire, Weezer, Twenty One Pilots, The 1975, Arctic Monkeys and Bastille. Indie rock remains the main equivalent in modern rock radio as of February 2014.

See also
 Active rock - A widespread successor for new hard rock and heavy metal bands, similar to mainstream rock, it does play some classic hard rock favorites but less focused on, in favor of new and emerging artists as well as new music from familiar artists as well
 Alternative rock (genre)
 Campus radio
 Classic alternative - a format that plays alternative music from the 1970s through 1990s, in technicality, it's classic rock that hasn't been given recognition.
 College rock
 Indie rock
 Mainstream rock - famously created after the legendary AOR format during the 1970s, which was short-lived until the early to mid-1980s, mainstream rock has become more favorable over classic rock. It is used to play popular rock hits from the 1970s up until the mid-2000s and has little current music in its playlists. Few radio stations will play newer rock artists; unlike active rock, it's basically modern classic rock.
 Post-grunge

References

External links
 Billboard's Top 20 Modern Rock Tracks

 
Alternative rock
Radio formats
Rock radio formats